Bernardo de la Guardia (14 April 1900 – 21 February 1970) was a Costa Rican fencer. He competed in the individual sabre event at the 1936 Summer Olympics. He was also the flag bearer for Costa Rica at the 1936 Games.

References

External links
 

1900 births
1970 deaths
Sportspeople from San José, Costa Rica
Costa Rican male sabre fencers
Olympic fencers of Costa Rica
Fencers at the 1936 Summer Olympics
20th-century Costa Rican people